was a Japanese politician who exercised significant power in the early years of the Kamakura period, which was reflected by her contemporary sobriquet of the "nun shogun". She was the wife of Minamoto no Yoritomo, and mother of Minamoto no Yoriie and Minamoto no Sanetomo, the first, second and third shoguns of the Kamakura shogunate, respectively. She was the eldest daughter of Hōjō Tokimasa and sister of Hōjō Yoshitoki, both of them shikken of the Kamakura shogunate.

Early life to marriage (1156–1182)
Hōjō Masako [her real name is unknown, she was called Masako after her father's name Tokimasa by later researchers] was born in 1156, eldest child of Hōjō Tokimasa, leader of the influential Hōjō clan of Izu province, and his wife, Hōjō no Maki. Masako's parents were still in their teens, so she was raised by many ladies-in-waiting and nannies. Masako was born into a world of war and strife. In Kyoto, the capital of Japan, the Hōgen Rebellion was in full swing. Cloistered Emperor Toba and Emperor Sutoku warred over who would be the next emperor. The Hōjō clan wisely chose to stay out of the rebellion, even though the Hōjō family was descended from the Taira clan and thus was related to the imperial family.

During the Heiji Rebellion in 1159, the Taira clan under Taira no Kiyomori, defeated the Minamoto clan with the support of Cloistered Emperor Go-Shirakawa. Minamoto no Yoshitomo, leader of the Minamoto clan, was executed while his sons and daughters were either executed or sent to nunneries. Of his surviving sons, Minamoto no Yoshitsune and Minamoto no Noriyori were forced into priesthood, while Minamoto no Yoritomo, at the age of thirteen, was exiled to Izu in the domain of Hōjō Tokimasa. While this was happening, Masako was barely an infant. The Taira under Kiyomori now were in successful control of Japan.

Masako was the oldest child of fifteen. She was instructed in horseback riding, hunting, fishing, and she ate with men rather than with the women of the household. Her brother, Hōjō Yoshitoki, was born in 1163 would eventually become the second Hōjō shikken (regent) of the Kamakura shogunate and head of the Hōjō clan. Another of her brothers, Hōjō Tokifusa, would become a member of the Rokuhara Tandai.

Masako married Yoritomo around 1177, against her father's wishes. In 1179, they had their first daughter, Ō-Hime. As Yoritomo's wife, she participated in the government administration and eventually became a representation of power for men of the Hōjō clan.

The same year a disillusioned Imperial Prince Mochihito, son of Emperor Go-Shirakawa, called on the Minamoto members remaining in Japan to overthrow the Taira. Mochihito thought the Taira had denied him the throne to offer the throne to Emperor Antoku, who was half Taira. Minamoto no Yoshitomo [Yoshitomo has been executed many years earlier; this must be a mistake for "Yoritomo"] considered himself the head of the Minamoto and responded. He had the full support of the Hōjō and Hōjō Tokimasa, not to mention Masako. The Minamoto center was at the city of Kamakura, to the east of Izu in Sagami Province.

Thus, the Genpei War, the final war between Minamoto and Taira had begun. In 1180, Masako's elder brother Munetoki was killed at Battle of Ishibashiyama and Yoshitoki became heir of Hōjō clan. In 1181, Taira no Kiyomori died, leaving the Taira in the hands of his son Taira no Munemori. In 1182, Masako and Yoritomo had their first son, Minamoto no Yoriie, who would be the heir.

The Genpei War and its aftermath (1182–1199)
In 1183, Yoritomo's rival and cousin Minamoto no Yoshinaka took Kyoto, forcing the Taira (and Emperor Antoku) to Shikoku. Quickly, Emperor Go-Toba was installed by the Minamoto. Nonetheless, Minamoto no Yoshitsune and Minamoto no Noriyori, Yoritomo's half brothers who had joined Yoritomo drove Yoshinaka out and executed him, and took Kyoto in the name of Yoritomo (and the Hōjō.)

By 1185, the Taira were completely defeated at the Battle of Dan-no-ura. Munemori was executed, while the remaining Taira either were executed or drowned, including the young Emperor Antoku. Minamoto no Yoritomo was now the undisputed leader of Japan. Hōjō Masako and her family had stood by Yoritomo through it all. She rode with him on his campaigns and was never defeated in battle.

His new allegiance to his wife's family and her dislike of her brothers-in-law, as well as an internal power struggle brought up by the three brothers, eventually resulted in the arrest and execution of Yoshitsune and Noriyori. Yoritomo even created new titles, such as shugo and jitō, which Hōjō Tokimasa received approval from Cloistered Emperor Go-Shirakawa in Kyoto. The capital was not moved to Kyoto, but remained away from the court in Kamakura.

In 1192, Yoritomo was named shōgun by Cloistered Emperor Go-Shirakawa, who died later that year. He was now the most powerful man in Japan, and gave that power over to Masako and the Hōjō clan. That same year Masako and Yoritomo had another son, Minamoto no Sanetomo.

Yoritomo's death and familial strife (1199–1205)
In 1199, Minamoto no Yoritomo died. He was succeeded as shōgun by his son, Minamoto no Yoriie. Since he was only eighteen, Hōjō Tokimasa proclaimed himself shikken or regent for Yoriie. Masako also had a strong position since her son was shōgun. Since her husband was dead, she shaved her head and became a Buddhist nun, receiving a tonsure from the priest Gyōyū. However, she did not take up residence in a monastery or a nunnery, and still involved herself in politics. Along with her father Tokimasa and her brother Yoshitoki, Masako created a council of regents for the eighteen-year-old Yoriie. The headstrong shōgun hated his mother's family and preferred his wife's family, the Hiki clan, and his father-in-law, Hiki Yoshikazu.

Hōjō Masako overheard a plot that Yoshikazu and Yoriie were hatching, and turned in her own son to Tokimasa, who did not hurt Yoriie but had Yoshikazu executed in 1203. Now, Shōgun Yoriie was very sick and retired to Izu Province. He was murdered in 1204, no doubt by Tokimasa's orders. Masako had not been aware of this. During the murders and purges of the Hiki clan, Minamoto no Ichiman, Yoriie's eldest son and heir and Masako's grandson, was also executed since he was part Hiki himself.

In 1203, Masako's other son by Yoritomo, Minamoto no Sanetomo, became the third shōgun with Tokimasa as regent. Sanetomo was closer to his mother than his elder brother was, and still a child when appointed shōgun, by contrast his brother, who was forced to abdicate as shōgun was now an adult.  Nonetheless, Masako and Yoshitoki, the heir to the Hōjō, were angry with their father, especially after their mother, Hōjō no Maki, died in 1204. Masako's sister's husband, Hatakeyama Shigetada, was wrongfully executed on Tokimasa's orders even after Yoshitoki, Masako, and Tokifusa told Tokimasa he was not guilty of the "treason" charges. Hōjō Tokimasa was by 1205 the most powerful man in Kamakura.

Masako heard rumors that Tokimasa was planning to execute Sanetomo and replace him with one of his allies, so Masako and Yoshitoki immediately ordered Tokimasa to step down and go into priesthood or they would rebel. Hōjō Tokimasa abdicated in 1205, and was sent off to a monastery in Kamakura, where he shaved his head and became a monk, dying in 1215.

The later years (1205–1225)

Tokimasa was ousted in 1205 when Minamoto no Sanetomo became shōgun. The position of the Hōjō clan was still secure. Masako's brother, Hōjō Yoshitoki, succeeded as shikken for Sanetomo, and Masako herself remained in a powerful position as a negotiator with the court. In 1218, Masako was awarded the court rank of Junior Second Rank by the imperial government. She continued to work towards the creation of an advisory council. During this time, she was sent by Regent Yoshitoki on a mission to the Cloistered Emperor Go-Toba, to ask if Minamoto no Sanetomo might adopt one of the emperor's sons as an heir. The emperor refused.

In 1219, Sanetomo was killed by his nephew Kugyō, son of his murdered elder brother Yoriie. Sanetomo's death marked the end of the Minamoto line of shōguns. Masako and Hōjō Yoshitoki selected Kujō Yoritsune, known as Fujiwara no Yoritsune, as the next shōgun. Because Yoritsune was still an infant, Masako was able to act as de facto shōgun until her death. Yoritsune belonged to the Kujō clan (itself part of the Fujiwara clan) but his grandmother was the niece of first shōgun Yoritomo. This meant that whilst he was not strictly a member of the Hōjō clan he was still a figurehead for them.

During the Jōkyū War of 1221, Go-Toba rebelled against the Hōjō. Kamakura was greatly upset by that news, but Masako is said to have calmed it down with her celebrated speech to Kamakura vassals. Azuma Kagami, the official chronicle of the Kamakura shogunate, tells that Masako summoned the vassals and had these words delivered to them by Adachi Kagemori, the Vice-Governor of Akita Fortress:

Regent Yoshitoki and his eldest son, Hōjō Yasutoki, responded to the rebellion by regaining Kyoto,resulting in the exile of Go-Toba. Masako continued to consolidate rule under the advisory council, manage relationships and connections between imperial and aristocratic families, and administer judgments and postwar rewards. In an era that acknowledged the authority and legitimacy of women in rule, Masako's dominance enabled the Hōjō clan to dominate the Kamakura Shogunate until the downfall of the government in 1333.

Hōjō Masako died in 1225 at the age of 69. Due to her lifestyle of cloistered rule, she was known as the ama-shōgun, or the "nun-shōgun". Azuma Kagami portrayed her as a peer of Empress Lü in China and Empress Jingū of Japan.

In Fiction
Shima Iwashita played Hōjō Masako in Kusa Moeru, the 1979 Taiga drama.
Masako is played by Eiko Koike in The 13 Lords of the Shogun, the 2022 Taiga drama.

See also

Hōjō clan
Hōjō Tokimasa
Hōjō Yoshitoki
Hōjō Yasutoki
Hōjō Tokifusa
Kugyō
Minamoto no Yoritomo
Minamoto no Yoriie
Minamoto no Sanetomo
Kujō Yoritsune
Emperor Go-Toba
Emperor Go-Shirakawa
Taira no Kiyomori
Kamakura shogunate

References

Sources

External links
 Samurai Archives: Hojo Masako 
 History Detective Podcast: The Nun Shogun Hōjō Masako

1150s births
1225 deaths
12th-century Buddhist nuns
12th-century Japanese women
12th-century women rulers
13th-century Buddhist nuns
13th-century Japanese women
13th-century women rulers
Masako
Japanese Buddhist nuns
Japanese women in warfare
Minamoto clan
People of Kamakura-period Japan
People of Heian-period Japan
Women in 12th-century warfare
Women of medieval Japan